Parish is a church territorial unit constituting a division of a diocese.

Parish may also refer to:

Church territorial units
 Parish (Catholic Church)
 Parish (Church of England)
 Parish (Denmark), Church of Denmark

Government
Although derived from church usage, Parish may also refer to a secular local government administrative entity:
 Parish (administrative division), in other countries outside the British Isles
 Civil parish (disambiguation), several forms in the British Isles

People with the name

Places
 Parish (village), New York, a village located in the Town of Parish, New York, USA
 Town of Parish, New York
 Cape Henry Parish, Greenland

Other uses
 The Parish, a defunct Louisiana cuisine restaurant in Portland, Oregon, US
 The Parish, a campaign in the 2009 video game Left 4 Dead 2
 Parish (TV series), an upcoming American drama series

See also
Parrish (disambiguation)